The Professional Basketball League, often abbreviated to the PBL, was the pre-eminent men's professional basketball league in Russia, and the successor to the Russian Super League 1, which is now the second-tier division of the Russian basketball league system.

The PBL was the second version of the Russian Professional Basketball Championship.

History 
Established in 2010, the league contained 10 teams in its inaugural 2010–11 season. 9 of those teams participated in the 2009–10 season of Russian Super League 1, and the 10th team was Nizhny Novgorod. The inaugural 2010–11 season started on October 9, 2010, with a match between Dynamo Moscow and CSKA Moscow, on Dynamo's home court, the Krylatskoye Sports Palace. CSKA won by a score of 81 to 63.

The 2011–12 season featured 10 teams, like the inaugural season, however, Dynamo Moscow was replaced with the 2011 Russian Super League 1 champions Spartak Primorye.

Merging with VTB United League 
In May 2012, all the PBL clubs gathered to decide which format would be used for the next season, and some club's directors raised the possibility of merging with the VTB United League, to produce greater competition between the Russian basketball clubs. They suggested that the new league would be named the Eastern European Professional Basketball League.

In July 2012, the Council of VTB United League gave a definitive decision. It was decided that the PBL league would continue for one more year, with some of the games of the VTB United League that took place between two Russian clubs being counted as PBL games. The first tier Russian clubs then replaced the PBL with the VTB United League as their new national domestic league, starting with the 2013–14 season.

Champions

Awards winners

Most Valuable Player 
 Maciej Lampe: (2011)
 Davon Jefferson: (2012)

Playoffs MVP 
 Victor Khryapa: (2011)
 Alexey Shved: (2012)

Russian basketball clubs in European and worldwide competitions

See also 
 USSR Premier League
 Russian Cup
 USSR Cup

References

External links 
  
  

 
2010 establishments in Russia
1
Defunct basketball leagues in Europe
Sports leagues established in 2010
2013 disestablishments in Russia